Roussillon is a regional county municipality in the Montérégie region of Quebec, Canada. The seat is in Saint-Constant, Quebec. The region's population was 171,443 as of the 2016 census.

Subdivisions
There are 11 subdivisions and one native reserve within the RCM:

Cities & Towns (9)
 Candiac
 Châteauguay
 Delson
 La Prairie
 Léry
 Mercier
 Saint-Constant
 Sainte-Catherine
 Saint-Philippe

Municipalities (1)
 Saint-Mathieu

Parishes (1)
 Saint-Isidore

Native Reserves (1)
 Kahnawake

Demographics

Population

Language

Transportation

Access Routes
Highways and numbered routes that run through the municipality, including external routes that start or finish at the county border:

 Autoroutes
 
 

 Principal Highways
 
 
 
 

 Secondary Highways
 
 
 
 

 External Routes
 None

See also
 List of regional county municipalities and equivalent territories in Quebec

References

 
Census divisions of Quebec